World Para Archery Championship, was first held in 1998 in the UK and take place every two years.

Events

 https://www.ianseo.net/Details.php?toId=818 - 2015
 http://ianseo.net/Details.php?toId=2040 - 2017

Champions

Recurve Standing / Open

Compound Open

Wheelchair / Visual Impairment

Note: 1. W1/W2 in 2011

References

 https://www.ianseo.net/

External links
 World Archery Federation

 

Recurring sporting events established in 1998